Man spricht Deutsch is the fifth album by German metalcore band Callejon.

It features exclusively cover versions of famous German songs. The album entered the German Media Control Charts at number 7.

Track listing

Credits 
Guest musicians
 Bela B. on "Schrei nach Liebe"
 K.I.Z on "Ich find' dich scheiße"

Charts

References

External links 
 

2013 albums
Callejon (band) albums